Případy 1. oddělení (Cases of the 1st Department in English) is a Czech crime television series. The series is based on real criminal cases investigated by Czech Police. People involved in screenwrighting of the series include Jan Malinda (journalist MF Dnes) and Josef Mareš (chief investigator of the real 1st department). The series was selected the best Czech crime television series in last decade. Main characters are based on real life investigators and other people. The cases reflect some of the most famous real criminal cases of the modern Czech Republic. Series was renewed for third season to be aired in 2022. Season 3 concluded  on 28 November 2022.

Cast

Main
 Ondřej Vetchý as mjr. Tomáš Kozák
 Boleslav Polívka as mjr. Václav Plíšek 
 Filip Blažek as kpt. Martin Pražák
 Petr Stach as kpt. Petr Anděl
 Miroslav Vladyka as por. Vítězslav Sršeň
 Miroslav Hanuš as mjr. Josef Korejs
 Igor Chmela as mjr. Dušan Vrána (since season 2)
 Barbora Bočková as kpt. Bc. Adéla Čulíková (season 3)
 Juraj Loj as kpt. Mgr. Jiří Netík (season 3)

Supporting
 Igor Bareš as plk. Vladimír Jeřábek
 Ondřej Malý as MUDr. Karel Vojíř
 Sabina Remundová as JUDr. Anna Švihlíková, prosecutor
 Jan Meduna as por. Ondřej Kavalír
 Petra Hřebíčková as Andrea Skopcová, journalist

Episodes

Production
The series began filming on March 18, 2013, and continued filming until December 2013. He held a press conference on 10 December 2013. The series was produced by Czech Television and Michal Reitler's creative production group. Police offices, prosecutor's office, newsroom, autopsy room, cells and other buildings or rooms seen were built on one of the floors of the former Komerční banka building in Sokolovská street in Prague 9. Some episodes also feature real crime scenes; 149 actors appeared in the first series and it was filmed in no less than 237 locations over a period of 284 days.

First ideas for the series arose in 2008, after half a year only Jan Malinda discovered a policeman who was also willing to join the project; it was the colonel of the Prague Police Directorate, Ing. Josef Mareš, who later became the official screenwriter. In the first part, he played a short extra role as a uniformed police officer, and although he spent 23 years with the Police of the Czech Republic, he wore the uniform for the first time. In the tenth episode, he played a short extra role as one of the investigators. The series' working title was Homicide.

The character of Miroslav Vladyka was originally intended as a supporting role; after the pilot, the creators decided to include Vladyka as one of the main characters.

The second season was filmed from 1 March 2015 to 13 July 2015. Filming completed in August 2015; it was filmed for 80 days.

The third season was filmed from 10 May 2021 to 1 March 2022

Shooting locations
The first and third season were filmed in and around Prague while the second season was filmed in and around Prague, Plzeň, Tábor, Jihlava, some locations in Moravia and also in Dresden and elsewhere in Saxony.

Prequel
Czech Television started to broadcast tv series called Nineties in January 2022. It serves as a prequel to Případy 1. oddělení with some characters reappearing while being recast by younger actors.

Reception
The series was ranked in a poll among iDNES.cz readers as the best Czech crime series of the decade.

References

External links 
Official site
IMDB site

Czech crime television series
Czech-language television shows
2014 Czech television series debuts
2022 Czech television series endings
Television shows set in the Czech Republic
Czech Television original programming